Dr. Quinn, Medicine Woman is an American Western drama series created by Beth Sullivan and starring Jane Seymour who plays Dr. Michaela "Mike" Quinn, a physician who leaves Boston in search of adventure in the Old American West and who settles in Colorado Springs, Colorado.

The television series ran on CBS for six seasons, from January 1, 1993 to May 16, 1998.  During its entire original run, the show aired from 8–9 pm Eastern time on Saturday nights. Episodes typically range from 43 to 48 minutes in length (without including commercials) with the exception of the pilot episode and a few other which are around 1 hr and 30 minutes in length.  Episodes were broadcast in standard definition.  In total, 150 episodes were produced, plus two television movies which were made after the series was cancelled.

Series overview

Episodes

Season 1 (1993)

Season 2 (1993–1994)

Season 3 (1994–95)

Season 4 (1995–96)

Season 5 (1996–97)

Season 6 (1997–1998)

Movies

Dr. Quinn, Medicine Woman: The Movie (1999)

Dr. Quinn, Medicine Woman: The Heart Within (2001)

Dr. Quinn, Medicine Woman
Dr. Quinn, Medicine Woman
it:La signora del West#Episodi